The St. Louis Stars were a major Negro league baseball team that played in the Negro American League for one season in 1937. They were a charter member of the NAL, but the team disbanded prior to the 1938 season due to financial difficulties. This was an entirely different organization from the original St. Louis Stars.

This version of the Stars played their home games at Metropolitan Park.

References 

Negro league baseball teams
Baseball teams in St. Louis
Defunct baseball teams in Missouri
Baseball teams disestablished in 1937
Baseball teams established in 1937